Heyme is a German surname. Notable people with the surname include:

Geoff Heyme (born 1942), Australian rules footballer
Hansgünther Heyme (born 1935), German theatre director 

German-language surnames